The 2009 WPS International Draft was a special draft for the Women's Professional Soccer teams Atlanta Beat and Philadelphia Independence taking place on September 22, 2009.  Each expansion team picked up to five international players, to be roughly even with the seven existing WPS teams.

Format
Official WPS release
 The maximum number of internationals an expansion team may select during the international expansion draft is 5, less any international players (e.g., non-green card holders) selected by a team in the expansion draft.
 As per current rules, no team may hold the rights to more than 6 internationals at any one time and may only roster 5 at any one time as per USSF regulations.
 The Philadelphia Independence will select first in the international draft, the Atlanta Beat second, alternating picks throughout.

Results

See also
 List of WPS drafts

References
womensprosoccer on Twitter (Archived 2009-09-26) - see September 22, 2009
Summary on BigSoccer.com (Archived 2009-09-26) - posts #1014 and #1015 on page 102 of the thread "WPS - All horses in the stable?"
Atlandta Beat Selects International Players 

2009
International Draft
WPS International Draft